WMYT-TV (channel 55) is a television station licensed to Rock Hill, South Carolina, United States, serving the Charlotte, North Carolina area as an affiliate of MyNetworkTV. It is the only major commercial television station in the Charlotte market to be licensed to a community in South Carolina. WMYT-TV is owned by Nexstar Media Group alongside Belmont, North Carolina–licensed Fox affiliate WJZY (channel 46). Both outlets share studios on Performance Road (along I-85) in unincorporated northwestern Mecklenburg County (with a Charlotte mailing address); through a channel sharing agreement, the stations transmit using WJZY's spectrum from an antenna in Dallas, North Carolina, along the Catawba River.

WMYT-TV is branded as My 12, in reference to its channel location on most Charlotte area cable providers.

History

Early history
From 1974 to 1978, the UHF channel 55 allocation in Rock Hill belonged to W55AA, a low-powered repeater of PBS member network South Carolina Educational Television. On January 3, 1978, SCETV programming moved to full-powered WNSC-TV on channel 30.

The present station on channel 55 first signed on the air on October 21, 1994, as WFVT, an independent station owned by Indiana-based Family 55. Capitol Broadcasting Company, then owner of WJZY, operated the station under a local marketing agreement. WJZY had the rights to a large amount of syndicated programming, but didn't have nearly enough time to air it. WFVT's arrival offered a solution. Under the terms of the LMA, WJZY bought WFVT's entire broadcast day, and aired most of its surplus syndicated programming on WFVT.

WFVT became a charter affiliate of The WB Television Network when it debuted on January 11, 1995, and changed its on-air branding from "TV55" to "WB55" shortly afterward. WJZY joined the United Paramount Network (UPN) when that network debuted five days later on January 16. In February of that year, the station was added to most Charlotte area cable systems. In the city of Charlotte, it was placed on Time Warner Cable channel 17, a slot that had long been held by The Disney Channel (then carried by most area providers as a premium service). The station ran ads in local newspapers that featured Bugs Bunny (though not the network's mascot, often used in Kids' WB marketing) pulling off a pair of Mickey Mouse ears and suggesting that viewers should re-program their televisions and VCRs lest they think "some rodent still lives there."

On August 5, 1999, the Federal Communications Commission (FCC) reversed its longstanding regulations against permitting common ownership of two full-power stations in the same television market; Capitol Broadcasting bought channel 55 outright the following year, creating a duopoly with WJZY. This was one of two duopolies formed in the Charlotte market during the 2000 calendar year, the other involving the purchase of WAXN-TV (channel 64) by WSOC-TV (channel 9)'s owner Cox Enterprises. WFVT subsequently changed its callsign to WWWB in 2001, to reflect its network affiliation. For most of The WB's run, channel 55 was one of the network's strongest affiliates.

MyNetworkTV affiliation
Shortly after Fox Entertainment Group's February 22, 2006 announcement of the formation of MyNetworkTV, WWWB was announced as the network's Charlotte affiliate. Sister station WJZY had already decided to join The CW, a network created out of CBS Corporation and Time Warner's decision to shut down UPN and The WB, effective that September. It would not have been an upset had WWWB been chosen, however. CW officials were on record as preferring the "strongest" WB and UPN affiliates, and Charlotte had been one of the few markets where the WB and UPN affiliates had both been relatively strong ratings performers. WWWB's affiliation with MyNetworkTV made Charlotte the first city in the nation with a duopoly involving affiliates of both The CW and MyNetworkTV.

On April 28, 2006, WWWB changed its call letters to WMYT-TV, in anticipation of its new affiliation. WMYT officially affiliated with MyNetworkTV upon the network's debut on September 5, 2006, branding on-air as "MyTV12," in reference to its location on most area cable providers. For a time in 2006 and 2007, WMYT erected several advertising signs around the Charlotte area describing several Charlotte landmarks as "my ___."

WMYT served as the over-the-air home for the NBA's Charlotte Bobcats from 2006 until the team moved all of its local broadcasts to regional sports network Fox Sports Carolinas (co-owned with WMYT and WJZY until 2019) after the 2007–08 season.

Sale to Fox Television Stations
On January 14, 2013, Fox Television Stations entered into an agreement to acquire WMYT and WJZY from Capitol Broadcasting Company for $18 million (the sale was formally announced on January 28). This marked a re-entry into North Carolina for Fox, which owned WGHP in High Point from 1996 to 2008. The deal included a time brokerage agreement clause that would have had Fox take over the operations of WJZY and WMYT, and acquire the duopoly's non-license assets for $8.24 million, if the deal was not closed by June 1. The FCC granted its approval on the sale on March 11, and the deal was consummated on April 17.

As MyNetworkTV was owned by Fox's then-parent company News Corporation, the acquisition made WMYT the first owned-and-operated station of a commercial broadcast network in the Charlotte market. On May 9, WMYT introduced an updated logo that more closely resembled the logos used by its sister stations, and also changed its on-air brand to just "My 12"; WMYT became the only MyNetworkTV O&O that used its cable channel position in its branding instead of its virtual channel number. Sister station WJZY acquired the Fox affiliation from WCCB (channel 18) on July 1, which made WJZY the first station in Charlotte to be an owned-and-operated station of one of the "Big Four" networks.

FCC spectrum auction and WJZY spectrum merge
On April 13, 2017, the FCC identified that Fox Television Stations sold the spectrum of WMYT. FTS was compensated $46.4 million for WMYT to go off-the-air as part of the spectrum auction, with FTS choosing to merge WMYT's spectrum onto that of WJZY via a channel sharing arrangement. The merge was done on June 6, 2018.

Sale to Nexstar Media Group
On November 5, 2019, Fox Corporation announced that WMYT-TV and WJZY would be acquired by Nexstar Media Group for $45 million in a deal concurrent with Fox's purchase of KCPQ and KZJO in Seattle and WITI in Milwaukee, Wisconsin from Nexstar. Nexstar stated that WMYT and WJZY were "geographically complementary" to its existing properties in the Southeastern United States. The sale was completed on March 2, 2020.

Newscasts
In 2000, NBC affiliate WCNC-TV (channel 36) entered into a news share agreement with what was then WFVT-TV to produce a half-hour 10 p.m. newscast for the station; the program was cancelled in 2002, due to low ratings; it was the second prime time newscast produced by WCNC, which briefly produced a 10:00 p.m. newscast for WCCB in 1999.

On April 9, 2012, WMYT-TV began broadcasting a half-hour 10 p.m. newscast produced by CBS affiliate WBTV (channel 3). This program originally ran on sister station WJZY from September 2003 to April 8, 2012 (with a simulcast on both stations from April 9 to 15, 2012), although low ratings for the newscast on that station—which placed a distant third in that timeslot behind the WSOC-produced prime time newscast on WAXN-TV and WCCB's in-house 10 p.m. newscast—prompted its move to WMYT, citing a more suitable audience on channel 55. With the switch, the program was renamed accordingly from WBTV News at 10 on CW46 to WBTV News at 10 on MyTV12. The WBTV newscast moved back to WJZY when it became a Fox owned-and-operated station on July 1, 2013, before being discontinued altogether the day prior to the January 1, 2014 launch of WJZY's own news department. Currently, WMYT airs syndicated programming in the 10 p.m. hour.

Technical information

Subchannel

Prior to April 2011, the station's second digital subchannel was a standard-definition simulcast of its main channel, but later went dark. There were plans to add the Retro Television Network to the subchannel in 2008, which never occurred; RTV would end up on WHKY-TV digital subchannel 14.2 in early 2010. In May 2007, it leased its third subchannel to WGTB-LP, a low-powered religious station. On December 5, 2011, WMYT replaced the WGTB-LP simulcast with programming from Jimmy Swaggart's SonLife Broadcasting Network (one of the earliest instances in which a commercial network station has carried a non-commercial religious network through a subchannel).

On September 10, 2012, it changed the PSIP name of 55.2 from WMYT-SD to SOUL. The following day, a slate was added stating that the Soul of the South Network would be launching on the subchannel in the near future, and was later modified to show a launch date of May 1, 2013. However, on that date, the subchannel went dark and the PSIP name was changed to "55.2." On June 23, 2013, This TV was added to the second subchannel after being dropped from WJZY's third subchannel. In late 2014, This TV was removed and the channel was soon deleted. 55.2 was reactivated on June 1, 2015 with the launch of the Buzzr network.  In July 2017, 55.4 was launched with the addition of Light TV.

On June 6, 2018, WMYT and its subchannels were merged onto WJZY's spectrum. WMYT's main schedule continues to map to 55.1, but its other subchannels became associated with WJZY's channel 46, with Sonlife moving to 46.3, Buzzr mapping to 46.7 and Light TV to 46.8.

Analog-to-digital conversion
WMYT-TV shut down its analog signal, over UHF channel 55, on June 12, 2009, the official date in which full-power television stations in the United States transitioned from analog to digital broadcasts under federal mandate. The station's digital signal remained on its pre-transition UHF channel 39, as channel 55 was re-allocated nationwide for Qualcomm's MediaFLO system. Through the use of PSIP, digital television receivers display the station's virtual channel as its former UHF analog channel 55, which was among the high band UHF channels (52-69) that were removed from broadcasting use as a result of the transition. In August 2011, the station downgraded its HD signal from 1080i to 720p, the preferred resolution format to which MyNetworkTV transmits its programming.

Out-of-market cable carriage
In recent years, WMYT has been carried on cable in several areas outside of the Charlotte television market, including cable systems within the Columbia and Florence–Myrtle Beach markets in South Carolina, the Greensboro–Winston-Salem–High Point market in North Carolina, and the Tri-Cities market in Tennessee and Virginia.

See also
Channel 12 branded TV stations in the United States
Channel 25 digital TV stations in the United States
Channel 55 virtual TV stations in the United States
List of television stations in South Carolina

References

External links
My12 Website

MyNetworkTV affiliates
Nexstar Media Group
Television channels and stations established in 1994
1994 establishments in South Carolina
MYT-TV
Rock Hill, South Carolina